is an andesitic volcano in the Mount Raiden Volcanic Group on the border between Iwanai and Rankoshi, Hokkaidō, Japan. Mount Mekunnai is a pyroclastic cone. The mountain consists of primarily non-alkali, mafic, volcanic rock. The rock is younger than that of neighboring Mount Raiden, being categorized at 700,000 to 13,000 years old. The rock is older than that of the Niseko Volcanic Group.

References

 Geographical Survey Institute

Mekunnai
Mekunnai